No Creek is a stream in Ohio County, Kentucky, in the United States.

No Creek was named after a surveyor was overheard saying "Why, that's no creek at all".

See also
List of rivers of Kentucky

References

Rivers of Ohio County, Kentucky
Rivers of Kentucky